Derek Robert Hussey (born 12 September 1948) is an Ulster Unionist Party (UUP) politician, who was a  Member of the Northern Ireland Assembly  (MLA) for  West Tyrone from 1998 to 2007.

Hussey was educated at Omagh Model School, Omagh Academy and Stranmillis College, Belfast. He was previously a teacher at Castlederg High School.

In 1989 he was elected to Strabane District Council. In 2007 he was elected Chairman of the council. In the 1996 election to the Northern Ireland Peace Forum, Hussey was elected as representative for West Tyrone.

In 1998 he was elected as MLA to the Northern Ireland Assembly and re-elected in 2003. He was an outgoing candidate in the 2007 Assembly elections, but lost his seat.  His brother, Ross Hussey, re-took the seat in 2011.

He also has a special interest in regional development, Ulster-Scots and the Orange Order. Hussey continued his role in local politics and was re-elected as the only UUP Councillor on Strabane District Council on 5 May 2011.

He was a member of a country and western music band and was known to wear cowboy boots in the 1998–2003 Assembly.

Convictions 
Derek Hussey has been convicted of driving with excess alcohol on three occasions, most recently in March 2016.

This follows previous convictions in 2004, when Mr Hussey was a Member of the Legislative Assembly for West Tyrone and 2011, when he was a councillor for the Derg DEA on Strabane District Council.

Following the most recent conviction in March 2016, Alderman Hussey was suspended by the Ulster Unionist Party On completion of community service the suspension was lifted and he still sits as an Ulster Unionist member of Derry City and Strabane District Council.

Security Forces 
The Hussey family have a strong connection with the security forces with Hussey himself serving as a part-time Special Constable with the Ulster Special Constabulary (USC), his late father Sydney Robert Hussey had served in the Royal Navy during World War II and the USC and Ulster Defence Regiment (UDR) until his death.  His mother served in the Women's Royal Naval Service and the UDR, his brother Harold William was a sergeant in the Royal Ulster Constabulary (RUC), his sister was in the UDR and Royal Irish Regiment and his politician brother Ross also served as a part-time member of the RUC.

References

External links
 NI Assembly biography
 UUP website

1948 births
Living people
Members of Strabane District Council
Members of the Northern Ireland Forum
Northern Ireland MLAs 1998–2003
Northern Ireland MLAs 2003–2007
People educated at Omagh Academy
People from Padstow
Ulster Special Constabulary officers
Ulster Unionist Party MLAs
Alumni of Stranmillis University College